State Route 162 (SR 162) is an east–west state highway in the north central and northeastern parts of the U.S. state of Ohio. Its western terminus is in Republic at SR 18 and SR 67 and its eastern terminus is in Akron at SR 18 (the intersection of Rand and Market Street) though signage along Market Street east of here shows it ending at High Street (SR 261 southbound).

Major intersections

References

External links

162
Transportation in Seneca County, Ohio
Transportation in Huron County, Ohio
Transportation in Lorain County, Ohio
Transportation in Medina County, Ohio
Transportation in Summit County, Ohio